Pilzno is a town in Dębica County, Subcarpathian Voivodeship, Poland.

Pilzno may also refer to:

Pilzno (Hasidic dynasty), a branch of Orthodox Judaism
Gmina Pilzno
Pilzno County

See also
Plzeň